Arclin is a settlement in the Municipality of Vojnik in eastern Slovenia. It lies on the main road south of Vojnik towards Celje. The area is part of the traditional region of Styria. It is now included with the rest of the municipality in the Savinja Statistical Region.

Cultural heritage
A small roadside chapel-shrine in the village dates to the late 19th century.

Notable people
Notable people that were born or lived in Arclin include:
Johann Siegmund Popowitsch (1705–1774), natural scientist

References

External links
Arclin at Geopedia

Populated places in the Municipality of Vojnik